Iwashimizu Dam  is a gravity dam located in Hokkaido Prefecture in Japan. The dam is used for power production. The catchment area of the dam is 339.2 km2. The dam impounds about 19  ha of land when full and can store 1814 thousand cubic meters of water. The construction of the dam was completed in 1959.

References

Dams in Hokkaido